Disambiguation is an album by a quintet co-led by jazz pianist Pandelis Karayorgis and violinist Mat Maneri, which was recorded in 2001 and released on the English Leo label. Maneri had the idea to ask Karayorgis to write pieces for a quintet date with saxophonist Tony Malaby and bassist Michael Formanek already in mind. Drummer Randy Peterson was on pianist's trio and has long played with Mat in Joe Maneri's quartet.

Reception

In his review for AllMusic, François Couture states "It falls to the jazzmen's credit that Disambiguation sounds so unforced and rehearsed, and flows so naturally. The pianist and violist know each other well enough to share a level of comfort that often finds improv musicians turning lazy and remaining on previously charted ground."

The Penguin Guide to Jazz notes that " Pandelis's Monk influence is very evident, and he swings more easily and relaxedly than on most of his previous records."

The JazzTimes review by Ron Wynn says "Pianist Pandelis Karayorgis has constructed five pieces on Disambiguation that are difficult to follow, but rewarding for those willing to hear them."

Track listing
All compositions by Pandelis Karayorgis
 "Case in Point" – 8:32
 "Three Plus Three" – 10:01
 "Matutinal" – 8:47
 "Disambiguation" – 11:50
 "Home" – 9:22

Personnel
Pandelis Karayorgis - piano
Mat Maneri - violin
Tony Malaby - tenor sax
Michael Formanek - bass
Randy Peterson - drums

References

 

2002 albums
Pandelis Karayorgis albums
Mat Maneri albums
Leo Records albums
Collaborative albums